Aljazeera.com is the main web address for the Al Jazeera English and former Al Jazeera America websites. The domain name was acquired by Al Jazeera Media Network in March 2011 from Aljazeera Publishing, a Dubai-based media company which owned the separate Aljazeera Magazine, after a long-running domain name dispute between the two entities. Al Jazeera English began promoting aljazeera.com instead of aljazeera.net/english since the domain name became part of Al Jazeera English. It is also used and subdivided as the homepage for the channels of Al Jazeera America and Al Jazeera Balkans. Al Jazeera Media Network also owns the original Aljazeera.net for their Arabic language channels and properties and Aljazeera.tr for their Turkish language properties including Al Jazeera Turk.

History of Al Jazeera Magazine
Until March 2011, aljazeera.com was an English language website for Aljazeera Magazine, which was unrelated to the Arabic satellite TV channel Al Jazeera; the latter operated websites in both Arabic (www.aljazeera.net) and English (english.aljazeera.net). It was also unrelated to Al Jazeera Newspaper of Saudi Arabia. The former website was operated by Aljazeera Publishing, described as an "independent media organisation."

Domain name dispute

In 2005, the Al Jazeera TV channel attempted to obtain the aljazeera.com domain name but failed.

In the Administrative Panel Decision, the WIPO Arbitration and Mediation Center found the TV Channel to have brought the proceedings in bad faith and found it had abused the administrative proceedings.

As of 2006, Aljazeera.com wrote on their About page:

"Important note: Aljazeera Publishing and Aljazeera.com are not associated with any of the below organisations:1. Al Jazeera Newspaper, Riyadh, Saudi Arabia whose website is al-jazirah.com2. Al Jazeera Satellite Channel whose website is aljazeera.net.3. Al Jazeera Information Centre who website is aljazeerah.infoAljazeera Publishing disassociates itself from the views, opinions and broadcasts of these titles."Views presented by Aljazeera.com were frequently misattributed to the Al Jazeera TV channel, including one case in which The Times'' criticised the channel in its leader column based on material published on Aljazeera.com, for which the newspaper later apologised. The magazine's editorial slant appears markedly different than that of the Al Jazeera TV channel, with the former far more critical of U.S. and Israeli policy than the latter.

In April 2011, the domain aljazeera.com directed to Al Jazeera English, and the domain ownership as listed on WHOIS records was updated from Al Jazeera Publishing to Al Jazeera Media Network. At the time of the purchase, a simple page stated "Moving to Doha", leading to certain long-time readers initially suspecting a hack of the website. No public details regarding the purchase of the domain has been made public by either party.

Activity since takeover
Since the takeover of aljazeera.com, Al Jazeera Media Network has subdivided the domain into other websites for their other non-Arabic news channels besides Al Jazeera English. In 2011, upon the launch of Al Jazeera Balkans the network created balkans.aljazeera.com which became the main page for the Al Jazeera Balkans website.

In 2013, upon the launch of Al Jazeera America, the network created america.aljazeera.com which was the main page for that channels website and to which aljazeera.com in the United States redirected to on the first click into aljazeera.com during the existence of the American channel. From there you would have the option of going to the Al Jazeera English page. Al Jazeera is also used the .aljazeera.com domain for specials between the two channels and cross links between the two. After the folding of Al Jazeera America and a re-design of the main aljazeera.com the america.aljazeera.com address beginning in November 2016 was redirected to the main Aljazeera.com

In 2014, Al Jazeera created plus.aljazeera.com, a secondary page for their all digital, all online and video on demand channel AJ+. Its primary page is ajplus.net.

As part of a 2014 re-design of the Al Jazeera English site, a new video.aljazeera.com was launched that offers a live stream of Al Jazeera English and Al Jazeera English shows and documentaries on demand. It is possible that the site could include video from other Al Jazeera channels.

References

External links
  
 balkans.aljazeera.com Al Jazeera Balkans 

Al Jazeera
Qatari news websites
Broadcasting websites
Internet properties established in 2011